Laccotrephes is a genus of water scorpion belonging to the family Nepidae. They are carnivorous insects that hunt near the water surface. They are not aggressive, but may inflict a painful bite if not handled carefully, which may cause a local reaction. There are about 60 species found in shallow stagnant or slow-moving waters in warm parts of Africa, Asia and Australia.

Anatomy

They are dark brown to rufous brown, elongate and flattened, aquatic insects with hooked raptorial forelegs and a long, thin tube (or siphon) protruding from the tip of the abdomen. The respiratory siphon consists of two filaments which are extensions of the eighth abdominal tergum. These in unison form an air duct which takes in air from above the water surface (similar to a snorkel). Air is fed via the tracheal system and spiracles on the dorsum of the first abdominal segment to an air store under the elytra.

Populations
The genus contains two distinguishable assemblages, with respectively Afrotropical and Indomalayan-Australasian centers of diversity. The two assemblages overlap only in Iran. Morphology of the male paramere is important in distinguishing species.

Species

The following are included in BioLib.cz:

 Laccotrephes ampliatus (Montandon, 1895)
 Laccotrephes annulipes (Laporte in Silbermann, 1833)
 Laccotrephes archipelagi (Ferrari, 1888)
 Laccotrephes armatus Montandon, 1898
 Laccotrephes armipes Montandon, 1909
 Laccotrephes ater (Linnaeus, 1767)
 Laccotrephes basilewskyi Poisson, 1955
 Laccotrephes biei Poisson, 1954
 Laccotrephes biimpresus Montandon, 1913
 Laccotrephes bokumai Poisson, 1960
 Laccotrephes brachialis Gerstaecker, 1873 – Africa
 Laccotrephes breddini Montandon, 1913
 Laccotrephes brevicaudatus Poisson, 1954
 Laccotrephes calcar Distant, 1904
 Laccotrephes calcaratus Montandon, 1898
 Laccotrephes celebensis Polhemus & Keffer, 1999 – Sulawesi
 Laccotrephes chinensis (Hoffmann, 1925)
 Laccotrephes collarti Poisson, 1940
 Laccotrephes dentatus (Ferrari, 1888)
 Laccotrephes depressus (Montandon, 1895)
 Laccotrephes dilatatus (Montandon, 1895)
 Laccotrephes dipidii Poisson, 1954
 Laccotrephes dissimulatus Montandon, 1912 – Africa
 Laccotrephes dubia Ferrari, 1888
 Laccotrephes ellipticus Gerstaecker, 1892
 Laccotrephes elongatus Montandon, 1907
 Laccotrephes erekhtheus Linnavuori, 1971
 Laccotrephes eusoma (Ferrari, 1888)
 Laccotrephes fabricii Stål, 1868 – Africa
 Laccotrephes flavovenosa (Dohrn, 1860)
 Laccotrephes fuscus (Linnaeus, 1758)
 Laccotrephes gomai Poisson, 1960
 Laccotrephes griseus (Gúerin-Méneville, 1835)
 Laccotrephes grossus (Fabricius, 1787)
 Laccotrephes hyperion Linnavuori, 1971
 Laccotrephes ingens Ferrari, 1888
 †Laccotrephes incertus Popov, 1971
 Laccotrephes irresectus Montandon, 1914
 Laccotrephes japonensis Scott, 1874
 Laccotrephes kabarei Poisson, 1960
 Laccotrephes kafakumbai Poisson, 1957
 Laccotrephes kahuzii Poisson, 1960
 Laccotrephes kakyeloi Poisson, 1957
 Laccotrephes katekei Poisson, 1954
 Laccotrephes kazibae Poisson, 1954
 Laccotrephes keilak Linnavuori, 1971
 Laccotrephes latimanus Montandon, 1909
 Laccotrephes limosoides Poisson, 1954
 Laccotrephes limosus Stål, 1865
 Laccotrephes longicaudatus Nieser, Zettel & Chen, 2009
 Laccotrephes lupialae Poisson, 1954
 Laccotrephes maculatus (Fabricius, 1775)
 Laccotrephes mancinii Poisson, 1957
 Laccotrephes masombwei Poisson, 1954
 Laccotrephes mozambica Poisson, 1954
 Laccotrephes niala Linnavuori, 1981
 Laccotrephes occultus Lundblad, 1933
 Laccotrephes oculatus Montandon, 1898
 Laccotrephes overlaeti Poisson, 1957
 Laccotrephes palestinensis Nieser, Chen & Guilbert, 2009
 Laccotrephes papuus Montandon, 1900
 Laccotrephes pfeiferiae (Ferrari, 1888) – Southeast Asia
 Laccotrephes pseudoampliatus Poisson, 1956
 Laccotrephes pseudoater Poisson, 1954
 Laccotrephes robustior Zettel, 2008
 Laccotrephes robustus Stal, 1871
 Laccotrephes ruber (Linnaeus, 1764)
 Laccotrephes simulatus Montandon, 1913
 Laccotrephes sondaicus J. Polhemus & Keffer, 1999 – Sumbawa and Flores
 Laccotrephes steindachneri (Ferrari, 1888)
 Laccotrephes tristis (Stål, 1854) – Australia
 Laccotrephes vicinus (Signoret, 1863) – Africa

References

External links
 

Nepidae
Nepomorpha genera